St. Jerome at Prayer is a painting of St. Jerome by Hieronymus Bosch, thought to have been completed c. 1482. Today it is housed at the Museum of Fine Arts in Ghent.

History
The work is known only from its acquisition by the museum in 1908. As for most of Bosch's works, dating has been long disputed, dates having varied from 1490–1500 to 1495–1505. However, dendochronologic analysis has proved that it has been painted not after 1482.

Description
St. Jerome was a frequent subject of 15th century European art, depicted in his studio or during his penitence in the desert. Bosch for this picture adopted the latter iconography, although his saint is prone instead of kneeling. He is praying with a crucifix in his arms, also an unusual gesture of communion with Christ.

Jerome lies on a rock located under a kind of shell-like cave. He is surrounded by his traditional symbols (the lion - although in this case it has a smaller size than usual - the galero, the Bible), but Bosch, as common in his works, also added some bizarre elements, such as the bony pig or the spherical shell emerging from the pool . This could symbolize the world floating towards decay.

An owl and little owl are depicted on a branch: they allude, respectively, to heresy and the struggle against heresy. The Ten Commandments tables can be seen above the cave. The landscape is wide, in green tones.

References

Sources

1480s paintings
Paintings by Hieronymus Bosch
Paintings in the collection of the Museum of Fine Arts, Ghent
Bosch
Lions in art
Birds in art